Powles is a surname. Notable people with the name include:

Edward Powles (1921–2008), English Royal Air Force pilot 
Guy Powles  (1905–1994), New Zealand diplomat
John Powles (1948–2010), Canadian president of the Canada-Japan Society
John Diston Powles (c.1787–1867), English businessman
Lewis Charles Powles (1860–1942), English painter
Michele Powles  (born 1976), New Zealand novelist, playwright, and non-fiction writer
Ray Powles (born 1938), British physician
Sophie Powles (born 1988), English actress 
Tim Powles (born 1959), New Zealand music producer and artist

See also
Powle